The 1997 Gold Coast Classic was a women's tennis tournament played on outdoor hard courts at the Hope Island Resort Tennis Centre in Hope Island, Queensland in Australia that was part of Tier III of the 1997 WTA Tour. It was the first edition of the tournament and was held from 30 December 1996 through 5 January 1997. Third-seeded Elena Likhovtseva won the singles title.

Finals

Singles

 Elena Likhovtseva defeated  Ai Sugiyama 3–6, 7–6, 6–3
 It was Likhovtseva's only title of the year and the 2nd of her career.

Doubles

 Naoko Kijimuta /  Nana Miyagi defeated  Ruxandra Dragomir /  Silvia Farina 7–6, 6–1
 It was Kijimuta's 1st title of the year and the 3rd of her career. It was Miyagi's 1st title of the year and the 5th of her career.

External links
 ITF tournament edition details
 Tournament draws

 
Brisbane International
Gold
January 1997 sports events in Australia
December 1996 sports events in Australia